Enikő Szabó (born 10 November 1979) is Hungarian athlete specialising in the sprinting events. She won the silver in the 100 metres at the 2003 Summer Universiade.

Competition record

References

1979 births
Living people
Hungarian female sprinters
Universiade medalists in athletics (track and field)
Universiade silver medalists for Hungary
Medalists at the 2003 Summer Universiade